Arnold Szyfman (23 November 1882 in Ulanów – 11 January 1967 in Warsaw) was a Polish theatre director and stage director. Founder of the Polish Theatre in Warsaw. He supervised the construction of Teatr Polski in Warsaw which opened in 1913 with Zygmunt Krasiński's Irydion. One of the most beautiful playhouses in Europe, it was equipped with a revolving stage and up-to-date lighting, and was under Szyfman's management from 1913 to 1939, except for his two-year internment in Russia in the First World War. In hiding during the next war, Szyfman resumed management of the Polski in 1945, was fired by the communist authorities in 1949 and returned for a final time from 1955 to 1957. He was also the manager of other Warsaw theatres and companies. At the Polski, he employed the best artists and directed numerous productions himself, including 22 Shakespeare plays.

Awards:

 1925 – Officer's Cross of the Order of the Restitution of Poland; French Legion of Honor Cavalier's Cross; Corona d'Italia Officer's Cross
 1946 – Golden Cross of Merit
 1959 – Order of the Banner of Labor, 1st class

References

External links
Arnold Szyfman at the Culture.pl 

1882 births
1967 deaths
Polish theatre directors